L'Île-d'Olonne is a commune in the Vendée département  in the Pays de la Loire region in western France.

See also
Communes of the Vendée department

References

Communes of Vendée